The Dartmouth Big Green women's ice hockey program represents Dartmouth College. In 2001, Dartmouth participated in the inaugural NCAA Championship tournament. Since then, they have appeared in the "Frozen Four", the semifinals of the NCAA hockey tournament, three additional times.

History
Dartmouth College started a women’s ice hockey program on January 7, 1978, six years after first admitting women students. The Big Green  defeated Middlebury by a 6–5 score. The Big Green finished their inaugural season with 7 wins, 7 losses, and 1 tie. Against Ivy League teams, the Big Green was 1–3–1.

Big Green player Judy Parish Oberting was named to the first U.S. National Team that competed at the 1990 IIHF Women's World Championship. Oberting was named to the Ivy League's Silver Anniversary Team in 1999. In addition, she coached the Dartmouth's women's hockey team from 1998–2003.

In 1998, Sarah Hood was one of two Ivy League players named first team All-Americans. This was the first time that Ivy League women's hockey players were bestowed such an honor.

The team has won the ECAC regular season title in 2001, 2002, and 2007 and the post-season tournament in 2001, 2003, 2007, and 2009.  The Big Green was the Ivy League champion 8 times (1991, 1993, 1995, 1998, 2001, 2002, 2004 and 2007).

The Ivy league announced in July 2020 that play would be suspended in Fall 2020 due to the coronavirus pandemic.

In August 2020, Laura Schuler stepped down as head coach, and Morgan Illikinen, Class of '15, was chosen as interim head coach.

Year by year

* Schuler took a one-year leave to coach the 2018 Canadian Women's Olympic Hockey Team.

Current roster
As of September 8, 2022.

Career stats

Scoring

Captains

Olympians

Awards and honors
 Gillian Apps, 2007: Patty Kazmaier Award Finalist, ECAC Player of the Year, Ivy League Player of the Year, AWHCA All-America 
 Correne Bredin, 2001 AWHCA All-America, First Team All-ECAC, First Team All-Ivy. 2003 AWHCA All-America, First Team All-Ivy.
 George Crowe, 1996 ECAC Co-coach of the year, 2004 Joe Burke Award,
 Sarah Devens, 1993: ECAC Rookie of the Year, Ivy League Rookie of the Year
 Carly Haggard, 2000: ECAC Rookie of the Year, Ivy League Rookie of the Year. 2002: Patty Kazmaier Award Finalist, ECAC Player of the Year, Ivy League Player of the Year, AWHCA All-America. 2003: Patty Kazmaier Award Finalist, First Team All-ECAC.
 Sarah Hood, 1997: First Team All-Ivy. 1998: Patty Kazmaier Award Finalist, Sarah Devens Award, AWHCA All-America, First Team All-ECAC, First Team All-Ivy
 Judy Parish Oberting, 1988: First Team All-ECAC, First Team All-Ivy, ECAC Rookie of the Year. 1989 First Team All-Ivy. 1990 First Team All-Ivy
 Lottie Odnoga, 2019-20 All-Ivy League Honorable Mention 
 Sarah Parsons, 2007: ECAC Rookie of the Year, Ivy League Rookie of the Year. 2010 First Team All-Ivy
 Cherie Piper, 2005 Patty Kazmaier Award Finalist
 9 Sanders, 1983 Ivy League Rookie of the Year, 1985 First Team All-Ivy
 Estey Ticknor, 1982 Ivy League Rookie of the Year, 1984 First Team All-Ivy, 1985 First Team All-Ivy
 Sarah Tueting, 1995: First Team All-ECAC, Ivy League Rookie of the Year 
 Gretchen Ulion, 1991: Ivy League Rookie of the Year. 1992: First Team All-Ivy. 1993: Ivy League Player of the Year, First Team All-ECAC. 1994: Ivy League Player of the Year. 
 Katie Weatherston, 2005 AWHCA All-America, 2007 ECAC Tournament Most Valuable Player,
Source:

All-Ivy
 Sarah Howald, 1996 First Team All-Ivy
 Kristin King, 2001 First Team All-Ivy, 2002 First Team All-Ivy
 Jenna Cunningham, 2009 First Team All-Ivy
Robyn Chemago, 2017 Second Team All-Ivy
 Christine Honor, 2017-18 Honorable Mention All-Ivy
Lotti Odnoga, 2019-20 Honorable Mention All-Ivy

New England hockey awards
 Mark Hudak, 2010–11 New England Women's Coach of the Year
 Kelly Foley, 2010–11 New England Women's Division I All-Stars

Statistical leaders
 Amy Ferguson, NCAA leader, 2000–01 season, Goalie winning percentage, .867
 Carly Haggard, NCAA leader, 2001–02 season, Points per game, 2.22
 Carly Haggard, NCAA leader, 2001–02 season, Goals per game, 1.16

Big Green players in professional hockey

See also
:Category:Dartmouth Big Green women's ice hockey players
Dartmouth Big Green men's ice hockey

References

External links
 

 
Ice hockey teams in New Hampshire